Michael A. G. Haykin  is the Professor of Church History and Biblical Spirituality and Director of The Andrew Fuller Center for Baptist Studies at the Southern Baptist Theological Seminary.

He is the general editor of The Complete Works of Andrew Fuller, a project that publishes "a modern critical edition of the entire corpus of Andrew Fuller's published and unpublished works." Though Haykin was trained as a Patristic scholar, he also developed himself in the area of 18th-century British evangelicalism, particularly the English Particular Baptist history and spirituality.

Haykin is a prolific writer having authored numerous books, over 250 articles and over 150 book reviews. He is also an accomplished editor with numerous editorial credits.

In 2018 Haykin was elected as a Fellow of the Royal Historical Society in recognition of his contributions to historical scholarship.

Early life
Haykin was born in England of Irish and Kurdish parents. He grew up in Birmingham, England and Coventry, England, before moving to Canada with his family when he was twelve.

Haykin was converted to Christ in 1974. He attended Wycliffe College at the University of Toronto from 1974 to 1982, earning a doctorate in patristics, supervised by John P. Egan, S.J.

Career
Haykin served as principal and professor of church history and biblical spirituality at Toronto Baptist Seminary in Toronto, Ontario, Canada, from 2003 to 2007. Previously, he was a professor at Heritage Theological Seminary from 1993 to 1999 and at Central Baptist Seminary from 1982 to 1993. He was the editorial director of Joshua Press from 1999 to 2002. He was appointed to the faculty of the Southern Baptist Theological Seminary in 2007.

Russell D. Moore, dean of the School of Theology and senior vice president for academic administration at Southern Seminary was quoted as saying:
I sometimes wonder if Michael Haykin is one scholar or a conspiracy of brilliant minds masquerading as one man ... After all, he is a pacesetter in the very different fields of spiritual formation, Baptist studies, patristic history, and beyond. He is one of the most recognized scholars in the world in each of these fields, having written and lectured extensively in each area, even while serving as a seminary administrator, popular conference speaker, and leader within the Canadian Baptist churches.

Education
B.A. in Philosophy from the University of Toronto (1974),
M.Rel. from Wycliffe College, University of Toronto (1977),
Th.D. in Church History from the University of Toronto and Wycliffe College (1982).

Publications

Books authored
Michael Haykin & Jerry Slate, Loving God and Neighbor with Samuel Pearce, (Lexham Press, 2019) 
Michael Haykin & Brian Croft & Ian H. Clary, Being a Pastor: A Conversation with Andrew Fuller, (Evangelical Press, 2019) 
Eight Women of Faith, (Crossway, 2016) 
Michael Haykin & Matthew Barrett, Owen on the Christian Life: Living for the Glory of God in Christ, (Crossway, 2015) 
Michael Haykin, Anthony L. Chute & Nathan A. Finn, The Baptist Story: From English Sect to Global Movement, (B&H Academic, 2015) 
Michael Haykin & C. Jeffrey Robertson Sr, To the Ends of the Earth: Calvin's Missional Vision and Legacy, (Crossway, 2014) 
Patrick of Ireland: His Life and Impact, (Christian Focus, 2014) 
Ardent Love for Jesus: English Baptists and the Experience of Revival in the Long Eighteenth Century, (Evangelical Press, 2013) 
The Reformers and Puritans as Spiritual Mentors: Hope Is Kindled, (Sola Scriptura Ministries International, 2012) 
 Rediscovering the Church Fathers: Who They Were and How They Shaped the Church (Crossway, 2011)  
The Empire of the Holy Spirit, (BorderStone Press, LLC 2010). 
The Christian Lover: The Sweetness of Love and Marriage in the Letters of Believers, (Reformation Trust Publishing, January 31, 2009).
Michael Haykin, Roger D. Duke & James Fuller, Soldiers of Christ, Selections from the Writings of Basil Manly, Sr. and Basil Manly, Jr. (Founders Press, 2009).
The God who draws near: An introduction to biblical spirituality (Evangelical Press, 2007).
Jonathan Edwards: The Holy Spirit in Revival (Evangelical Press, 2005);
The Pure Fountain of the Word: Andrew Fuller as an Apologist (Paternoster Press, 2004).
The Armies of the Lamb: The spirituality of Andrew Fuller (Joshua Press, 2001);
Kiffin, Knollys and Keach: Rediscovering Our English Baptist Heritage (Reformation Today Trust, 1996);
One heart and one soul: John Sutcliff of Olney, his friends, and his times (Evangelical Press, 1994);
The Spirit of God: The Exegesis of 1 and 2 Corinthians in the Pneumatomachian Controversy of the Fourth Century (E. J. Brill, 1994).

Book contributor
"Foreword" to Andrew Fuller, Backslider (H&E Publishing, 2018), vii-viii.
"Foreword" to Andrew Fuller, What is Truth? (H&E Publishing, 2018), vii-x.
Afterword to The Lost Sermons of Scottish Baptist Peter Grant, editor Terry Wilder, published by BorderStone Press, LLC, 2010.
"Afterword" to Glenn Tomlinson, From Scotland to Canada: The Life of Pioneer Missionary Alexander Stewart (Guelph, Ontario: Joshua Press, 2008), 239-240.
"Foreword" to Joel R. Beeke, Living for God's Glory: An Introduction to Calvinism (Orlando, Florida: Reformation Trust Publishing, 2008), ix-x.
"Series Preface" to David S. Dockery and Roger D. Duke, eds., John A. Broadus: A Living Legacy (Studies in Baptist Life and Thought; Nashville, Tennessee: B & H Publishing Group, 2008), x-xi.
"Foreword" to Bill James, Expecting great things, Attempting great things: Two addresses on the 80th anniversary of the founding of The Toronto Baptist Seminary and Bible College (Toronto: Toronto Baptist Seminary and Bible College, 2007), 5-8.
"Foreword" to Tim Shenton, John Rogers—sealed with blood.  The story of the first Protestant martyr of Mary Tudor's reign (Leominster: Day One Publications, 2007), 5-6.
"Foreword" to J. Stephen Yuille, The Inner Sanctum of Puritan Piety: John Flavel's Doctrine of Mystical Union with Christ (Grand Rapids: Reformation Heritage Books, 2007), ix-xi.
"Foreword" to Robert W.  Oliver, History of the English Calvinistic Baptists 1771–1892: From John Gill to C. H.  Spurgeon (Edinburgh/Carlisle, Pennsylvania: The Banner of Truth Trust, 2006), xi-xii.
"Foreword" to Fred A. Vaughan, God's Prescription for Christian Worship: Towards Harmony in Music Styles (Belleville, Ontario: Guardian Books, 2005), 7.
"Recommendatory Preface" to Austin Walker, The Excellent Benjamin Keach (Dundas, Ontario: Joshua Press, 2004), 15-16.
"Foreword" to F.M. Buhler, Baptism: Three Aspects (Dundas, Ontario: Joshua Press, 2004), 5.
"Foreword" to Peter Naylor, Calvinism, Communion and the Baptists: A Study of English Calvinistic Baptists from the Late 1600s to the Early 1800s (Carlisle, Cumbria: Paternoster Press, 2003), xiii.

Books edited
Editor: 17-volume critical edition of the works of Andrew Fuller is being published under his editorship by Walter de Gruyter Press.  
Editor with Terry Wolever: A Noble Company, Volume 12, Biographical Essays on Notable Particular-Regular Baptists in America, The Canadians, (Particular Baptist Press, 2019). 
Editor with Roy M. Paul and Jeongmo Yoo: Glory to the Three Eternal: Tercentennial Essays on the Life and Writings of Benjamin Beddome (1718–1795), (Pickwick Publications, 2019). 
Editor with Mark Jones: A New Divinity: Transatlantic Reformed Evangelical Debates During the Long Eighteenth Century, (Vandenhoeck & Ruprecht Gmbh, 2018). 
Editor with Paul M. Smalley: Puritan Piety: Writings in Honor of Joel R. Beeke, (Mentor, 2018). 
Editor: An Orthodox Catechism: Being the Sum of the Christian Religion, Contained in the Law and the Gospel, (Reformed Baptist Academic Press, 2013). 
Editor with Mark Jones: Drawn into Controversie: Reformed Theological Diversity and Debates Within Seventeenth-century British Puritanism, (Vandenhoeck & Ruprecht, 2011). 
Editor: The Life and Thought of John Gill (1697–1771): A Tercentennial Appreciation (E.J. Brill, 1997). 
Editor with Terry Wolever: The British Particular Baptists, 1638-1910. 5 Volumes (Particular Baptist Press, 1998 [rev. 2019], 2000, 2003, 2018, 2020).
Editor: The Advent of Evangelicalism: Exploring Historical Continuities, (B&H Academic, November 1, 2008).

Recent peer reviewed articles
"John Gill". The Literary Encyclopedia. 10 April 2010.
" 'He Went About Doing Good': Eighteenth-Century Particular Baptists on the Necessity of Good Works", American Theological Inquiry, 3, no.1 (2010), 55–65.
"Books on Calvin in 2009", The Southern Baptist Journal of Theology, 13, No.4 (Winter 2009), 64–8.
" "A Sacrifice Well Pleasing to God": John Calvin and the Missionary Endeavor of the Church",  The Southern Baptist Journal of Theology, 13, No.4 (Winter 2009), 36–43.
"Benjamin Beddome (1717–1795): His Life and His Hymns" in John H.Y. Briggs, ed., Pulpit and People: Studies in Eighteenth Century Baptist Life and Thought (Studies in Baptist History and Thought, vol. 28; Milton Keynes, U.K.: Paternoster, 2009), 93–111.
" "Soldiers of Christ, in Truth Arrayed": The Ministry and Piety of Basil Manly Jr. (1825–1892)", The Southern Baptist Journal of Theology, 13, No.1 (Spring 2009), 30-44.
"Evangelicalism and the Enlightenment: A Reassessment" in Michael A.G. Haykin and Kenneth J. Stewart, eds., The Emergence of Evangelicalism: Exploring Historical Continuities (Nottingham: Inter-Varsity Press, 2008), 37-60.
"Recovering Ancient Church Practices: A Review of Brian McLaren, Finding Our Way Again: The Return of the Ancient Practices", The Southern Baptist Journal of Theology, 12, No.2 (Summer 2008), 62-67.
" "For Those who Spurn the Sprinkled Blood!" Praying with Charles Wesley for Muslims", Southwestern Journal of Theology, 49, No.2 (Spring 2007), 186-198.

Recent articles
" "Your cup ... is intoxicating": Cyprian and the experience of the Lord's Supper", The Gospel Witness, 89, no.1 (June 2010), 4–7.
"Rewind: R.A. Fyfe: A Canadian Baptist Hero (Part One)", Barnabas (Summer 2010), 12.
"Ten Reasons for Studying Church History", Ten (Spring 2010), 15.
"Rewind: William Fraser: A Scottish Baptist Church Planter", Barnabas (Spring 2010), 12.
"Regeneration and Faith according to James Ussher's Irish Articles", The Gospel Witness, 88, no.9 (February 2010), 7–11.
""For God's Glory [and] for the Good of Precious Souls": Calvinism and Missions in the Piety of Samuel Pearce", Puritan Reformed Journal, 2, No.1 (January 2010), 277–300.
"Meditation: Why the Bible Calls Mary Blessed", PRTS Update, 7, no.1 [(February 2010), p. 1].
"The 18th Century Great Commission Resurgence: The call for repentance", The Baptist Messenger (January 11, 2010).
"Q & A", Barnabas, 2, no.1 (Winter 2010), 14.
"Rewind: Upper Canada Baptists: Stagnant", Barnabas, 2, no.1 (Winter 2010), 12.
"Christian Marriage in the 21st Century: Listening to Calvin on the Purpose of Marriage" in Joel R. Beeke, ed., Calvin for Today (Grand Rapids: Reformation Heritage Books, 2009), 211–24.
"Calvin and the Missionary Endeavor of the Church" in Joel R. Beeke, ed., Calvin for Today (Grand Rapids: Reformation Heritage Books, 2009), 169–79.
"Christian Psych Notes: Augustine and His Confessions", Christian Counseling Connection, 16, no.4 [(2009)], 6.
" "Dissent Warmed Its Hands at Grimshaw's Fire." William Grimshaw of Haworth and the Baptists of Yorkshire", Perichoresis, 7, no.1 (2009), 23–37.
"The 18th Century Great Commission Resurgence: Part 2. Praying for revival", The Baptist Messenger (December 21, 2009).
"The 18th Century Great Commission Resurgence: 1. From a garden to a dunghill: the spiritual need", The Baptist Messenger (December 7, 2009).
"Wrestling in Prayer", The Gospel Witness, 88, no.6 (November 2009), 10–13.
"Haykin on Calvin: A Quincentennial Appreciation", The Protestant Challenge (Fall 2009), 3-4.
"Rewind: The Earliest Baptists in Ontario", Barnabas, 1, no.3 (Fall 2009), 12.
"Love of the Brethren in First John and Church History", Puritan Reformed Journal, 1, No.2 (July 2009), 32–39.
"The life and ministry of John Calvin: A quincentennial appreciation", Evangelical Times, 43, No.7 (July 2009), 5-6.
"Rewind: Ignatius of Antioch: A Christ-Centred Man", Barnabas, 1, no.2 (Summer 2009), 10.
"Rewind: Ignatius of Antioch: The Cost of Faithfulness", Barnabas, 1, no.1 (Spring 2009), 10.
"Are You in Panic Mode?", Barnabas, 1, no.1 (Spring 2009), 6-8.
"A Tribute to Dr. Randy Singbeil", The Gospel Witness, 87, No.11 (April 2009), 14.
"Prophet, Priest and King", The Gospel Witness, 87, No.11 (April 2009), 3.
"That He might bring us to God: The Cross in 1 Peter", The Gospel Witness, 87, No.10 (March 2009), 8–11.
"Regeneration and Faith According to Two British Reformed Confessions", Puritan Reformed Journal, 1, No.1 (January 2009), 65–77.
With Victoria J. Haykin, "John and Idelette Calvin", The Founders Journal, 75 (Winter 2009), 28-31.
"Calvin on Missions", The Founders Journal, 75 (Winter 2009), 20-27.
"William Grimshaw of Haworth & the Baptists of Yorkshire", Journal of the Irish Baptist Historical Society, 16 (NS) (May–December 2008), 49–60.
"Paul: Collecting Money and Maintaining the Unity of the Spirit", The Banner of Truth, 541 (October 2008), 15-23.
"Regeneration and Faith, according to Two British Confessions", The Banner of Truth, 539-40 (August–September 2008), 20-32.
"Baptist Devotional Literature," in [Gary W. Long, ed.,] Baptist History Celebration 2007 (Springfield, Missouri: Particular Baptist Press, 2008), 538-551.
"Eruditione pietate ornatus: A Profile of John Gill (1607–1771)" in [Gary W. Long, ed.,] Baptist History Celebration 2007 (Springfield, Missouri: Particular Baptist Press, 2008), 10–14.
"Cultivating the Spirit" in Joel R. Beeke, Living for God's Glory: An Introduction to Calvinism (Orlando, Florida: Reformation Trust Publishing, 2008), 163-172.
""His Soul Refreshing Presence": Anne Dutton and her thoughts on the Lord's Supper", The Gospel Witness, 87, No.3 (August 2008), 3–5.
"Dr. Thomas of Toronto: The Life and Ministry of Benjamin Daniel Thomas (1843–1917)", The Gospel Witness, 87, No.1 (June 2008), 7-12.
"Introduction" to Hugh Black, Friendship (Guelph, Ontario: Joshua Press/Fenstanton, England: Leith Books, 2008), 1-5.
"A Pastors' and Theologians' Forum on Fundamentalism", 9Marks, 5, issue 2 (March/April 2008).
"Andrew Fuller: Life and Legacy", The Banner of Truth, 533 (February 2008), 22-25.
"John Newton (1725–1807) as a spiritual guide—'The great spiritual director of souls through the post': an appreciation in the bicentennial year of his entry into glory", Sovereign Grace Journal, 11, no.1 (January 2008), 4-15.
""To be a truly religious man": Piety & politics in the life and thought of William Wilberforce", The Gospel Witness, 86, No.6 (November 2007), 10-14.
"The Practice of Theological Education—Six Essential Adjectives", The Gospel Witness, 86, No.5 (October 2007), 7-9.
"Benefiting from the Fathers—A Test Case: Basil of Caesarea on Abortion", Eusebeia, 8 (Fall 2007), 11-18.
"Why study the Fathers?", Eusebeia, 8 (Fall 2007), 3-7.
"Andrew Fuller: Life and Legacy—A Brief Overview" in The Works of Andrew Fuller (1841 ed.; repr. Edinburgh/Carlisle, Pennsylvania: The Banner of Truth Trust, 2007).
" 'With Ev'ry Fleeting Breath': John Newton and the Olney Hymns", The Banner of Truth, 527/528 (August/September 2007), 30-42.
"Eminent Christians: John Gill", The Gospel Witness, 86, No.3 (August 2007), 14-15.
"Eminent Christians: Charles Wesley", The Gospel Witness, 86, No.2 (July 2007), 12-13.
" "Come, Thou Fount of Every Blessing": Robert Robinson's Hymnic Celebration of Sovereign Grace" in Steve West, ed., Ministry of Grace: Essays in Honor of John G.  Reisinger (Frederick, Maryland: New Covenant Media, 2007), 31-43.
" 'A Setter-Forth of Christ's Glory': Remembering the Life and Martyrdom of Thomas Cranmer", The Banner of Truth, 525 (June 2007), 1-15.
"D.  Martyn Lloyd-Jones and his Reading of Church History", Eusebeia, 7 (Spring 2007), 106-112.
"The Resurrection of Christ and Defending the Faith in the 2nd Century", The Gospel Witness, 85, No.11 (April 2007), 9-11.
"Eminent Christians: Abraham Booth", The Gospel Witness, 85, No.10 (March 2007), 13.
"With a Little Help From My Friends", 9Marks, 4, issue 1 (January 2007), 4-9.
"Eminent Christians: Christina Rossetti", The Gospel Witness, 85, No.7 (December 2006), 12-14.
" "The Elephant of Kettering": The Life and Ministry of Andrew Fuller (1754–1815)", Journal of the Irish Baptist Historical Society, 13 NS (2005–2006), 23-38.
"Reflections from the Funeral Service [for Dr.  G. A.  Adams]", The Gospel Witness, 85, No.6 (November 2006), 9-10.
"Remembering Abraham Booth (1734–1806)", Grace Magazine (October 2006), 5-6.
"Eminent Christians: Charles Haddon Spurgeon", The Gospel Witness, 85, No.4 (September 2006), 14.
"John Calvin on Missions", Reformation21, 13 (September 2006).
" "Death is at hand: Be ready": Thinking about Death with Abraham Booth", The Gospel Witness, 85, No.2 (July 2006), 7-9.
"Eminent Christians: Horatius Bonar", The Gospel Witness, 85, No.1 (June 2006), 15.
"Vintage Reading: Jonathan Edwards' Religious Affections", Eusebeia, 6 (Spring 2006), 102-104.
"Introducing Samuel Pearce" in Andrew Fuller, A Heart for Missions.  The Classic Memoir of Samuel Pearce (Birmingham, Alabama: Solid Ground Christian Books, 2006), i-vii.
"Eminent Christians: William Fraser", The Gospel Witness, 84, No.12 (May 2006), 16.
"The "Solas" in Church History: Three Case Studies", The Gospel Witness, 84, No.12 (May 2006), 3-5.
"Theologian of revival: Jonathan Edwards (1703–1758)", ET International, 2, No.2 (April–June 2006), 7.
"The Resurrection of the Great Shepherd", The Gospel Witness, 84, No.11 (April 2006), 3-6.
"Eminent Christians: Fanny Crosby", The Gospel Witness, 84, No.10 (March 2006), 15.
"The Experience of Four Seventeenth-century Baptists in the Fires of Persecution", The Gospel Witness, 84, No.9 (February 2006), 6-10.
"Benjamin Beddome (1717–1795) of Bourton-on-the-Water" in Benjamin Beddome, A Scriptural Exposition of the Baptist Catechism (1776 ed.; repr. Birmingham, Alabama: Solid Ground Christian Books, 2006), i-ix.
"Eminent Christians: William Carey", The Gospel Witness, 84, No.8 (January 2006), 13.
" 'The Most Glorious City of God': Augustine of Hippo and The City of God", Fellowship for Reformation and Pastoral Studies, 34, No.5 (January 2006).
" "The Most Glorious City of God": Augustine of Hippo and The City of God" in The Power of God in the Life of Man. Papers read at the 2005 Westminster Conference ([London: The Westminster Conference, 2005)], 37-57.
"Appreciation" of Gerard Chrispin, The Bible Panorama: Enjoying the whole Bible with a chapter-by-chapter guide (Leominster, England: Day One Publications, 2005), 10.
"Prayer and the Christian Life", The Gospel Witness, 84, No.6 (November 2005), 7-11.
" 'The Old, Glorious, Beautiful Face of Christianity': Congregationalism and Baptist Life", The Gospel Witness, 84, No.5 (October 2005), 10-13.
"Editorial: A Congregational Heritage", The Gospel Witness, 84, No.5 (October 2005), 3.
"Biographical Sketch [of Andrew Fuller]" in Andrew Fuller, The Backslider: His Nature, Symptoms and Means for Recovery (1801 ed.; repr.  Birmingham, Alabama: Solid Ground Christian Books, 2005), i-iv.
"An "Eminently Christian Spirit": The Missionary Spirituality of Samuel Pearce", Journal of the Irish Baptist Historical Society, 11, NS (2004–2005), 25-46.
"Extraordinary Charismatic Gifts", Reformation Today, 206 (July–August 2005), 3-14.
"Loving the truth: An exposition of James 5:19-20", The Gospel Witness, 83, No. 12 (May 2005), 7-10.
"John Rippon (1751–1836) and the Calvinistic Baptists: A review article".  Eusebeia, 4 (Spring 2005), 105-110.
" 'The clean sea breeze of the centuries': A Plea for Reading Church History", The Gospel Witness, 83, No.9 (February 2005), 4-8.
" 'At once so ancient and so new': An Early Christian Problem and the Answer", The Gospel Witness, 83, No.8 (January 2005), 11-12.
Selected "Patrick of Ireland on the Trinity", The Gospel Witness, 83, No.7 (December 2004), 8.
"Doctrine: Last Things", The Gospel Witness, 83, No.7 (December 2004), 8.
"Editorial: The Sublimest of Christian Truths", The Gospel Witness, 83, No.6 (November 2004), 3.
" 'Christ is All': Horatius Bonar (1808–1889) and his Christocentric piety", Eusebeia, 3 (Autumn 2004), 23-51.
"Doctrine: The Eternality of the Body", The Gospel Witness, 83, No.5 (October 2004), 7.
" 'A Pious Ministry': Benjamin Davies and Canada Baptist College", The Gospel Witness, 83, No.4 (September 2004), 13-15.
Edited " 'As Gold Refined': The Piety of Sarah Hopkins Pearce", The Gospel Witness, 83, No.4 (September 2004), 11-12.
"Editorial: Our Baptist Heritage", The Gospel Witness, 83, No.4 (September 2004), 3.
"Is the Reformation ... History?", The Protestant Challenge (2004:2), 1-5.
"The SBJT Forum: Racism, Scripture, and History", The Southern Baptist Journal of Theology, 8, No.2 (Summer 2004), 83-85.
"Doctrine: I Believe in the Forgiveness of Sins", The Gospel Witness, 83, No.3 (August 2004), 11.
"Doctrine: Keep In Step with the Spirit", The Gospel Witness, 83, No.1 (June 2004), 13.
"Doctrine: Risen Indeed", The Gospel Witness, 82, No.11 (May 2004), 6.
"The Central Message of Nahum", The Gospel Witness, 82, No.11 (May 2004), 3-6.
"Calvinistic Piety illustrated: A study of the piety of Samuel Pearce on the bicentennial of the death of his wife Sarah", Eusebeia, 2 (Spring 2004), 5-27.
With Ian Hugh Clary, "The Passion of the Christ", The Gospel Witness, 82, No.10 (April 2004), 12-15.
"Editorial: Glorying in the Cross", The Gospel Witness, 82, No.10 (April 2004), 3.
With Glendon G.  Thompson, "A Position Statement on Justification", The Gospel Witness, 82, No.9 (March 2004), 15.
"Doctrine: Being Human", The Gospel Witness, 82, No.9 (March 2004), 10.
"After Darkness, Light! Martin Luther and the rediscovery of justification by faith alone", The Gospel Witness, 82, No.8 (February 2004), 8-12.
"Doctrine: Devotion to Jesus Christ", The Gospel Witness, 82, No.8 (February 2004), 7.
"Doctrine: Both one and three", The Gospel Witness, 82, No.7 (January 2004), 15
"Doctrine: God", The Gospel Witness, 82, No.6 (December 2003), 12.
Introduced "John Ryland: Christ Manifested and Satan Frustrated", The Gospel Witness, 82, No.6 (December 2003), 11.
"Doctrine: 'The Coals of Orthodoxy' ", The Gospel Witness, 82, No.5 (November 2003), 9.
"Advancing the Kingdom of Christ: Jonathan Edwards, the Missionary Theologian", The Banner of Truth, 482 (November 2003), 2-10.
"John Ryland, Jr. —'O Lord, I would delight in Thee': The life and ministry of John Ryland, Jr. appreciated on the 250th anniversary of his birth", Reformation Today, 196 (November–December 2003), 13-20.
[With Robert B.  Lockey,] "Polemic, Polity, and Piety: Some Themes in the story of FEB CENTRAL" in Michael A.G. Haykin and Robert B. Lockey, eds., A Glorious Fellowship of Churches: Celebrating the History of the Fellowship of Evangelical Baptist Churches in Canada, 1953–2003 (Guelph, Ontario: The Fellowship of Evangelical Baptist Churches in Canada, 2003), 145-173.
" 'Jesus, Wondrous Saviour': Ontario Baptist Roots in the Nineteenth Century" in Michael A.G.  Haykin and Robert B.  Lockey, eds., A Glorious Fellowship of Churches: Celebrating the History of the Fellowship of Evangelical Baptist Churches in Canada, 1953–2003 (Guelph, Ontario: The Fellowship of Evangelical Baptist Churches in Canada, 2003), 115-143.
"Being Baptist: Roots and Distinctives" in Michael A.G. Haykin and Robert B. Lockey, eds., A Glorious Fellowship of Churches: Celebrating the History of the Fellowship of Evangelical Baptist Churches in Canada, 1953–2003 (Guelph, Ontario: The Fellowship of Evangelical Baptist Churches in Canada, 2003), 17-31.
" 'More Precious Than Treasure': Puritanism, Prayer and the Holy Spirit" in Michael A.G. Haykin, ed., Acorns to Oaks: The Primacy and Practice of Biblical Theology: A Festschrift for Dr. Geoff Adams (Dundas, Ontario: Joshua Press for The Toronto Baptist Seminary and Bible College, 2003), 141-152.
[With Lynette Adams,] "Geoffrey and Betty Adams: An Appreciation" in Michael A.G. Haykin, ed., Acorns to Oaks: The Primacy and Practice of Biblical Theology: A Festschrift for Dr. Geoff Adams (Dundas, Ontario: Joshua Press for The Toronto Baptist Seminary and Bible College, 2003), 13-18.
" 'Comfort in life and death': Olevianus, Ursinus and the Heidelberg Catechism", The Youth Messenger (Fall 2003), 3-5; (Spring 2004), 5-6.
" "Emanations of sweet benevolence': the beauty of God and of nature in the thought of Jonathan Edwards", Eusebeia, 1 (Autumn 2003), 17-25.
Edited " 'Like a burnt child that dreads the fire': Jonathan Edwards on Godly Fear", The Gospel Witness, 82, No.4 (October 2003), 11-13.
" 'Strive for Glory with God': Some Reflections by Basil of Caesarea on Humility", The Gospel Witness, 82, No.3 (September 2003), 3-6.
"With Swords And Trowels", Connections: TBS Alumni Newsletter (Fall 2003), 1-2.
" "A glorious fellowship of churches": Fellowship Baptist roots, 1920s-1960s", The Evangelical Baptist, 50, No.3 (September/October 2003), 7-10.
" 'A great heart warmer': Biblical spirituality and meditation", The Gospel Witness, 82, No.2 (July/August 2003), 7-9.
"John Sutcliff (1752–1814)" in Michael A.G. Haykin, ed., The British Particular Baptists, 1638-1910 (Springfield, Missouri: Particular Baptist Press, 2003), III, 20-41.
"Des moyens de piété pour nous approcher de Dieu: Un survol des disciplines spirituelles dans l'histoire de l'Église", La revue Baptiste Évangélique (Été 2003), 4-5.
"War: A View From the 18th Century", The Gospel Witness, 82, No.1 (June 2003), 3-4.
" A plea for reading church history", The Evangelical Baptist, 50, No.4 (May/June 2003), 30.
"Work among Jewels and precious Stones: The life and ministry of Hercules Collins (d. 1702)", Sovereign Grace Journal, 6, No.2 (May 2003), 4-7.
"An Early Canadian Plea for Theological Education", Worldwide Communique 10 (Winter, 2003), 5.
"Un profilo biografico di Jonathan Edwards", Studi di teologia, 29 (2003), 3-17.
"The Essential Disciplines of the Christian Life", The Gospel Witness, 81, No.5 (November 2002), 12-15; 81, No.8 (January 2003), 13-16; 81, No.9 (February 2003), 7-12.
"The Newfoundland Revival, 1766–1773", Good Tidings, 58, No.9 (November 2002), 6-7; 58, No.10 (December 2002), 9.
"Dr. Arnold Dallimore" in Fred A. Vaughan, comp., Fellowship Baptist Trailblazers: Life Stories of Pastors and Missionaries.  Book Two (Belleville, Ontario: Guardian Books, 2002), 73-78.
"Worship" in Michael A.G. Haykin, ed., A foundation for life: A study of key Christian doctrines and their application (Dundas, Ontario: Joshua Press, 2002), 95-100.
"J. Edwin Orr (1912–1987): Historian of Revival", Appendix to Michael F. Gleason, When God walked on campus.  A brief history of evangelical awakenings at American colleges and universities (Dundas, Ontario: Joshua Press, 2002), 131-135.
" 'God Is Jealous and the Lord Avenges'—The Central Message of Nahum", ", The Banner of Truth, 463 (April 2002), 8-14.
"Knowing and Adoring the Triune God", The Gospel Witness, 80, No.7 (January 2002), 8-12.
"John Calvin's Missionary Influence in France", Reformation & Revival Journal, 10, No.4 (Fall 2001), 35-44.
"Andrew Fuller (1754–1815)—and the Free Offer of the Gospel. Part 2", Reformation Today, 183 (September–October 2001), 29-32.
"Andrew Fuller (1754–1815)—and the Free Offer of the Gospel. Part 1", Reformation Today, 182 (July–August 2001), 19-26.
"Evangelicalism in Quebec—an overview", Grace Magazine (December 2000), 8-9.
" 'The Believer's Hollow Square': The new birth and justification by faith alone in the thought of George Whitefield", Sovereign Grace Journal, 2, No.1 (2000), 4-13.
" 'That Secret Refreshment': The Life of Oliver Cromwell (1599–1658)", The Free Reformed Student Journal (Summer 2000).
"Les «concerts de prière» et le réveil", La revue Baptiste Évangélique (Été 2000), 10-11.
Hearing the Word: Robert Hall's Reflections on How Best to Profit Spiritually from Preaching", Reformation and Revival Journal, 9, No.1 (Winter 2000), 137-146.
"The Study of the 18th Century British Calvinistic Baptist Community: Some recent resources", Reformation Today, 173 (January–February 2000), 29-32.
"Benjamin Francis (1734–1799)" in Michael A.G. Haykin, ed., The British Particular Baptists, 1638-1910 (Springfield, Missouri: Particular Baptist Press, 2000), II, 16-29.
"The Fire of Ardent Love: The life and witness of Benjamin Francis (1734–1799)", Reformation Today, 173 (January–February 2000), 5-14.
" 'The Clean Sea Breeze of the Centuries': The benefits of reading Calvinistic Baptist History", Reformation Today, 173 (January–February 2000), 1-4.

References

External links
Interview with Haykin on "New Books in Christian Studies"
Interview Choose a Faculty, The Southern Baptist Theological Seminary, 2015.

Living people
American Baptist theologians
Southern Baptist Theological Seminary faculty
University of Toronto alumni
Academic journal editors
Historians of Christianity
American historians of religion
1953 births